Rade Petrović-Njegoš (born 21 September 1982) is a Montenegrin football manager and former player who played as a midfielder. He Is manager of Jezero.

Club career
He spent most of his career playing in Montenegrin clubs, namely FK Budućnost Podgorica, FK Grbalj, FK Bokelj, FK Kom and FK Jedinstvo Bijelo Polje. The exception was between late 2005 and 2009 when he played in Sweden with Carlstad United BK, Serbia with FK Borac Čačak and Russian FC Terek Grozny.

International career
Petrović made his debut for Montenegro in a June 2007 Kirin Cup match against Colombia, coming on as a late sub for Mirko Raičević. It remained his sole international appearance.

References

External links
 
 
 Profile and stats until 2003 at Dekisa.Tripo

1982 births
Living people
Footballers from Podgorica
Association football midfielders
Serbia and Montenegro footballers
Montenegrin footballers
Montenegro international footballers
FK Budućnost Podgorica players
OFK Grbalj players
FK Bokelj players
FK Kom players
FK Jedinstvo Bijelo Polje players
Carlstad United BK players
FK Borac Čačak players
FC Akhmat Grozny players
OFK Titograd players
First League of Serbia and Montenegro players
Second League of Serbia and Montenegro players
Ettan Fotboll players
Serbian SuperLiga players
Russian Premier League players
Montenegrin First League players
Montenegrin expatriate footballers
Expatriate footballers in Sweden
Montenegrin expatriate sportspeople in Sweden
Expatriate footballers in Serbia
Montenegrin expatriate sportspeople in Serbia
Expatriate footballers in Russia
Montenegrin expatriate sportspeople in Russia

Petrović-Njegoš dynasty